Bordj Ghedir District is a district of Bordj Bou Arréridj Province, Algeria.

The district is further divided into 5 municipalities:
Bordj Ghédir
Belimour
El Anseur 
Ghilassa
Taglait

References

Districts of Bordj Bou Arréridj Province